Os Maias (Alguns) Episódios da Vida Romântica is a 2014 Portuguese film directed by João Botelho and based on the 19th century novel Os Maias by Eça de Queirós. It was released in September 2014.

Cast
Graciano Dias as Carlos da Maia
Maria Flor as Maria Eduarda
Marcello Urgeghe as Craft
Catarina Wallenstein as Maria Monforte
Pedro Inês as João da Ega
Pedro Lacerda as Thomaz d'Alencar
Hugo Mestre Amaro as Dâmaso Salcede
João Perry
Laura Soveral
Ricardo Aibeo
Filipe Vargas
Adriano Luz
Ana Moreira
Rita Blanco
Maria João Pinho
Jorge Vaz de Carvalho as narrator (voice)

References

External links

2010s historical drama films
2014 films
Brazilian historical drama films
Films based on works by Eça de Queirós
Films directed by João Botelho
Films set in the 19th century
Films shot in Portugal
Portuguese historical drama films
2014 drama films
2010s Portuguese-language films